Waterfront Cebu City Hotel & Casino is a four star hotel located in Cebu City, Philippines.  The hotel has 561 guestrooms.  Hotel function rooms include the Pacific Grand Ballroom, with over 2,000 m2  floor area, ten function rooms, and two pool gardens.

History
The Waterfront Cebu City Hotel & Casino was opened in 1998, in time for the ASEAN Tourism Forum held within the same year although plans for the hotel date back as early as 1993. The Cebu City hotel is the second establishment opened under the Waterfront Hotel & Casino brand with the first being in Mactan Island which opened in 1996.

Facilities
The hotel has a gaming area called Club Waterfront. The Casino Filipino is also in the hotel. It also hosts a 7,000-people capacity Pacific Grand Ballroom, which is the biggest MICE venue in Cebu City.

Notable events
2005 - Southeast Asian Games: Dancesport tournament
2011 - IBF International Featherweight title match between Rey Bautista and Heriberto Ruiz with Bautista clinching the belt.
2012 - Concert venues of Engelbert Humperdinck, Brian McKnight, Dan Hill, Jimi Jamison, and Rex Smith

References

External links
Waterfront Cebu City Hotel & Casino

Casinos completed in 1998
Hotels in Cebu
Casinos in the Philippines
Casino hotels
Hotels established in 1998
Hotel buildings completed in 1998